The 2014 BMW Open was a men's tennis tournament played on outdoor clay courts. It was the 99th edition of the event, and part of the ATP World Tour 250 series of the 2014 ATP World Tour. It took place at the MTTC Iphitos complex in Munich, Germany, from 28 April through 4 May 2014. Unseeded Martin Kližan won the singles title.

Points and prize money

Point distribution

Prize money 

* per team

Singles main draw entrants

Seeds

 Rankings are as of April 21, 2014.

Other entrants
The following players received wildcards into the main draw:
  Dustin Brown
  Peter Gojowczyk
  Alexander Zverev

The following players received entry from the qualifying draw:
  Thomaz Bellucci
  Martin Kližan
  Albert Ramos
  Jan-Lennard Struff

The following players received entry as lucky losers:
  Ričardas Berankis
  Michael Berrer

Withdrawals
Before the tournament
  Florian Mayer
  Gaël Monfils
  Vasek Pospisil
  Jiří Veselý (left Achilles tendon injury)

Retirements
  Michał Przysiężny (right ankle strain)

Doubles main draw entrants

Seeds

 Rankings are as of April 21, 2014.

Other entrants
The following pairs received wildcards into the doubles main draw:
  Matthias Bachinger /  Kevin Krawietz
  Alexander Satschko /  Jan-Lennard Struff

Champions

Singles

  Martin Kližan defeated  Fabio Fognini 2–6, 6–1, 6–2

Doubles

  Jamie Murray /  John Peers defeated  Colin Fleming /  Ross Hutchins, 6–4, 6–2

References

External links
Official website

 
2014 BMW Open
BMW Open
April 2014 sports events in Germany
May 2014 sports events in Germany